Paros or Parus was a town of ancient Greece on the island of Paros.

Its site is located near modern Parikia.

References

Populated places in the ancient Aegean islands
Former populated places in Greece
Paros
Greek city-states
Members of the Delian League